Dino-Riders is an animated television series that first aired in 1988. Dino-Riders was primarily a promotional show to launch a new Tyco toy line. Only fourteen episodes were produced, three of which were produced on VHS for the United States. The show aired in the U.S. as part of the Marvel Action Universe programming block.

The series focuses on the battle between the heroic Valorians and the evil Rulon Alliance on prehistoric Earth. The Valorians were a superhuman race, while the Rulons comprised several breeds of humanoids (ants, crocodiles, snakes, and sharks were the most common). Both races came from the future but were transported back in time to the age of dinosaurs. Once on Earth, the Valorians befriended dinosaurs, while the Rulons brainwashed them.

Ownership of the series passed to Disney in 2001 when Disney acquired Fox Kids Worldwide, which also includes Marvel Productions. The series is not available on Disney+.

Overview
The Valorians were a species of peaceful humanoids who lived on the planet Valoria until they were invaded by the predatory Rulons. A group of Valorians lead by Questar attempted to escape the Rulon invasion using a spaceship equipped with their "Space Time Energy Projector" (S.T.E.P.); however, something went wrong. They were sent back in time and space, to the planet Earth 65 million years back to the age of the dinosaurs. Unknown to them, the Rulon flagship, the Dreadlock, locked in with a tractor beam, was also sent back through time when the S.T.E.P. was activated.

After successfully landing on prehistoric Earth, the Valorians used their AMP ("Amplified Mental Projector") necklaces to telepathically communicate with the dinosaurs they encountered and eventually befriended them. On the other hand, the Rulons - led by the warlord Krulos - used brainwashing devices known as brain-boxes to control dinosaurs for their own needs. The Rulons then launched an attack on the Valorians, who called upon their dinosaur friends to assist them in fighting back. After ultimately defeating the Rulons, the Valorians renamed themselves Dino-Riders.

In regard to the dinosaur (and other animal) species present, the series is extremely anachronistic, showing late Cretaceous species like Tyrannosaurus rex alongside species from earlier eras such as dinosaurs from the Triassic, and Jurassic, including the Permian genus Dimetrodon, which lived 200 million years earlier, before dinosaurs existed.

It also show several Ice Age animals such as the Woolly Mammoth and the Smilodon, living alongside Archaeotherium, which lived during the Eocene 16 million years before the Ice Age. Plus, it shows Neanderthals coexisting with Smilodon, and the Megatherium which lived in North and South America, while Neanderthals lived in Eurasia.

Characters

Valorians
The Valorians are a race of superhumans from the planet Valoria who were renamed as the Dino-Riders and the main protagonists of the series.
 Questar (voiced by Dan Gilvezan) – The leader of the Valorians who is strong-willed and courageous.
 Mind-Zei (voiced by Peter Cullen) – A blind elderly warrior with a sixth-sense for detecting people around him, and who's an expert at hand-to-hand combat. He offers advice to Questar and is also Serena's grandfather.
 Yungstar (voiced by Joe Colligan) – Young and eager for action, is prone to letting pride get in his way. He rides a Deinonychus and flies a Quetzalcoatlus in later episodes.
 Serena (voiced by Noelle North) – Able to heal other beings and can sense when someone is in trouble. She is also the granddaughter of Mind-Zei.
 Turret (voiced by Charlie Adler) – A technician and scientist. Turret is in charge of the S.T.E.P. crystal.
 Llahd (voiced by Stephen Dorff) – The youngest of the Dino-Riders.
 Gunnur (voiced by Peter Cullen) – A hardened war veteran and high-ranking official who often helps train other Dino-Riders.
 Tagg (voiced by Wally Burr) – A mid-level official who also helps instructs in the training of the Dino-Riders. He rides a Pachycephalosaurus.
 Ikon (voiced by Cam Clarke) – A statistician as well as a pragmatist. Ikon is one of Questar's top advisors. He possesses a staff that allows him to answer Questar's questions almost instantly.
 Vector (voiced by Dan Gilvezan) – Vector is one of Questar's top advisors. He is a general contractor who has a computerized wrist strap that allows him to assess projects that need carried out such as camp expansion and infrastructure repair.
 Aero (voiced by Cam Clarke) – The competitive rival of Yungstar. He flies a Quetzalcoatlus and can maneuver it better than anyone.
 Tark - A high-ranking Dino-Rider official. Questar would often consult with Tark on a number of important matters, his years of experience, and his vast amount of knowledge has earned him respect from his peers.
 Ayce – He usually teaches training and equipment familiarization classes.
 Aries – Aries is a young warrior who is frequently unsure of himself and is always seeking guidance from the other Valorians. He mainly mans the artillery of the Diplodocus.
 Neutrino – He assists in various training courses. Although much of Neutrino's time is spent training others, Neutrino is more than capable on the battlefield.

Commandos
The Commandos are a special forces military unit within the Dino-Riders.

 Astra (voiced by Townsend Coleman) – A hardened war veteran and leader of the Commandos. Formerly a teacher at the Valorian University and once counted Questar as a student.
 Bomba (voiced by Peter Cullen) – An explosives expert who is utilized to make clearings or remove obstacles.
 Kameelian (voiced by Rob Paulsen) – Specializes in surveillance and reconnaissance. Kameelian is a master of disguise.
 Glyde (voiced by Frank Welker) – Aerial reconnaissance and artillery cover. Uses a glider to navigate through the air.
 Faze (voiced by Rob Paulsen) – Artillery expert.
 Rok – Expert in crossing rocky terrain such as mountains.

Cro-Magnons
The Valorians have also made allies with a tribe of Cro-Magnons. Among the known Cro-Magnons are:

 Zar (voiced by Townsend Coleman) – Leader of a clan of Cro-Magnons. He leads his clan against the evil Neanderthals of Grom and refuses to succumb to his powers like the other tribes before him.
 Kub (voiced by Ike Eisenmann) – A young but courageous Cro-Magnon who lost his father during an earlier attack by Grom. He helps the Valorians in their fight with the Rulons ever since going with them to the past to reunite with the Dino-Riders.
 Maya (voiced by Liz Georges) – Maya is a compassionate Cro-Magnon who is the Cro-Magnon equivalent of Serena as she is the healer of the tribe.

Rulons
The Rulons are a race of aliens that are the enemies of the Valorians and the main antagonists of the series.

 Emperor Krulos (voiced by Frank Welker) – The evil leader of the Rulons who rules them with fear. Krulos is a frog-like humanoid creature in an armored suit who seeks world domination. He mostly uses a Tyrannosaurus when going into battle.
 Rasp (voiced by Frank Welker) – Rasp is a cobra-like creature who is the leader of the Viper group and Krulos' second-in-command. Rasp always tries to usurp Krulos's place while keeping Hammerhead and Antor from trying to take his status.
 Hammerhead (voiced by Charlie Adler) – Hammerhead is a hammerhead shark-like creature who is the leader of the Sharkmen and one of Krulos' top generals. Hammerhead usually vies with Rasp and Antor for second-in-command status.
 Antor (voiced by Peter Cullen) – Antor is an ant-like creature who is the leader of the Antmen and one of Krulos' generals. Antor usually vies with Hammerhead and Rasp for second-in-command status.
 Krok (voiced by Cam Clarke) – A crocodile-like creature and one of Krulos' generals. He is entirely obedient to Krulos and focuses on serving his master rather than getting involved in the petty-squabbling in which his fellow generals engage.
 Skate (voiced by Frank Welker) – Skate is a manta ray-like creature who is a low-ranking official of the Rulons.
 Lokus (voiced by Charlie Adler) – Lokus is a locust-like creature who is a low-ranking official of the Rulons.
 Algar - A crocodile-like creature.
 Buzz - A locust-like creature.
 Dedeye - A Sharkman.
 Demon - An Antman.
 Drone - An Antman.
 Fang - A member of the Viper Group.
 Finn - A Sharkman.
 Fire - An Antman.
 Gill - A Sharkman.
 Gorr - A crocodile-like creature.
 Gutz - A crocodile-like creature.
 Kraw - A crocodile-like creature.
 Mako - A Sharkman.
 Pox - A locust-like creature.
 Rattlar - A member of the Viper Group.
 Rayy - A manta ray-like creature.
 Sidewinder - A member of the Viper Group.
 Six-Gill - A Sharkman.
 Skwirm - A member of the Viper Group.
 Sludj - A manta ray-like creature.
 Snarrl - A crocodile-like creature.
 Squish - A locust-like creature.
 Sting - An Antman.
 Termite - An Antman.

Neanderthals
Zar's tribe of Cro-Magnons have been at war with a rogue tribe of Neanderthals. Among the known Neanderthals are:

 Grom (voiced by Jack Angel) – Grom is the leader of a deadly clan of Neanderthals who seeks to control or annihilate all neighboring tribes. He has ruled his tribe for years and has struck fear into the hearts of many rival Neanderthal tribes. Following the fight against the Dino-Riders, Grom was accidentally pulled back to the Dino-Riders' time and runs off to join the Rulons.

Episodes
The Dino-Riders series consisted of a single season of 14 episodes. The first two episodes were produced for release on VHS as standalone specials, the first in 1987 and the second in 1988. Also in 1988, the series transitioned to television, with a further 11 episodes being produced and added to the specials to create a standard season's worth of 13 episodes. Lastly, in 1990, an additional VHS special was produced to promote the new range of "Ice Age" figures, released as "Ice Age Adventure" (but with the on-screen title "Dino-Riders in the Ice Age"). Below is a list of each episode along with the date it first aired.

Cast
 Charles Adler – Turret, Hammerhead, Lokus
 Jack Angel – Grom (in "Ice Age Adventure")
 S. Scott Bullock – 
 Wally Burr – Narrator, Tagg
 Cam Clarke – Aero, Ikonn, Krok
 Townsend Coleman – Astra (in "Ice Age Adventure"), Zar (in "Ice Age Adventure")
 Joe Colligan – Yungstar
 Peter Cullen – Gunnur, Antor, Mind-Zei, Bomba (in "Ice Age Adventure")
 Shawn Donahue
 Stephen Dorff – Llahd
 Ike Eisenmann – Kub (in "Ice Age Adventure")
 Liz Georges – Maya (in "Ice Age Adventure")
 Dan Gilvezan – Questar, Vector
 Noelle North – Serena
 Rob Paulsen – Faze, Kameelian
 Patrick Pinney – 
 Frank Welker – Emperor Krulos, Rasp, Glyde

Crew
 Wally Burr – Voice Director
 Stephen Hahn - Director (eps 1,14)
 Ray Lee - Supervising Director (eps 2–13)
 Kayte Kuch, Larry Parr, Sheryl Scarborough - Story Editors

Toys
In total, there were four series of Dino-Riders toys: Series 1 (1988), Series 2 (1989), Series 3 and Ice Age (1990). The Ice Age line focused on Ice age mammals rather than dinosaurs.

The larger toys in the range also had a motorized walking action with the dinosaur's head swaying from side to side. Each Rulon faction toy came with a different self-automated trap.

The dinosaurs were acclaimed for their highly detailed bodies and color, and impressed the Smithsonian Institution, who contacted Tyco to reproduce the dinosaurs (without the motorized mechanisms and wheels) for their "Dinosaur and other Prehistoric Reptile Collection". Dinosaur illustrator William Stout was credited for dinosaur design on the show's credits. Paleontologist Robert T. Bakker was hired as a consultant.

Series 1 (1988)
The release of the first series of Dino-Riders toys was timed to coincide with the cartoon series on television. It initially consisted of 5 Valorian and 6 Rulon toys, along with eight 2-figure packs. A sixth Valorian toy, Torosaurus, would be released at the end of the series. The Diplodocus, Torosaurus, Tyrannosaurus Rex, and Triceratops all had motorized walking mechanisms.

Action figures
 Questar / Krulos
 Proto / Rattlar
 Orion / Six-Gill
 Mind-Zei / Fire
 Quark / Finn
 Nova / Demon
 Mercury / Fang
 Boldar / Termite

Series 2 (1989)
The second series of Dino-Rider toys consisted of 7 new Valorian toys and 3 new Rulons, along with eight more 2-figure packs as well as 6 "Commandos". The Commandos consisted of a human figure with unique weapons and accessories.

The most notable toy from this series was the Brontosaurus, which was the largest toy in the entire range, measuring 34 inches long and 15 inches tall. In an effort to keep costs down, Tyco had to abandon several features that were originally intended to be part of the figure. These included motorized walking action, four figures instead of three, and an entirely different weapons system.

The Stegosaurus toy had motorized walking action, while the Pachycephalosaurus and Saurolophus both had a mechanism that allowed their bodies to thrust from a horizontal position with their tail in the air into a vertical position with their tail on the ground.

Action figures
 Questar / Krulos
 Serena / Skwirm
 Yungstar / Dedeye
 Mind-Zei / Sludj
 Hondo / Drone
 Ursus / Snarrl
 Neutrino / Poxx
 Graff / Kraw

Series 3 (1990)
The third series of Dino-Riders toys was split into two assortments: 3 new dinosaurs for the regular series and 4 prehistoric mammals for the new "Ice Age" concept. The dinosaur sets are among the rarest of the entire range due to a limited production run.

The Quetzalcoatlus, originally released as a Valorian in Series 1, was re-released as a Rulon with a new yellow and spotted black paint scheme. The Pachyrhinosaurus had motorized walking action.

Ice Age
The Ice Age subline was unique in that all of the animals produced belonged to the Valorian faction and, with the rest of the Series 3, are very hard to find. This line also included six more 2-figure packs. The Woolly Mammoth, the largest figure in the range, had motorized walking action.

Action figures
 Onk / Buzz
 Tor / Gorr
 Urg / Rayy
 Agga / Gill
 Ecco / Squish
 Wizz / Gutz

Rulon Warriors Battle Pack (2020) 
In 2020, Mattel released an Entertainment Earth exclusive battle pack, called the Rulon Warriors Battle Pack, modeled after Army Men. The kit, designed for children aged 6 and up, is described as:

"It's the heroic Valorians versus the evil Rulon Alliance in this exciting Dino-Riders Rulon Warriors Battle Pack - Entertainment Earth Exclusive. Recreate epic battle sequences inspired by the 1980s toy line and Dino-Riders animated series or create your own new adventures! This special edition collection contains 6 dinosaurs and 15 other figures, including such classic characters as Rulon leader Krulos, Bitor, Boldar, and Dino-Riders hotshot Llahd. Whether you're discovering Dino-Riders for the first time or you've been a fan since you were a kid, you do not want to miss this sensational opportunity to Harness the Power of Dinosaurs! Each figure measure approximately 1-inch tall and the dinos measure approximately up to 7-inches long" (Entertainment Earth)

Comics
Apart from the miniature comics included with each of the dinosaur toys, Marvel released a 3-part miniseries of Dino-Rider comics. The comics' storylines were considered to be much darker than the cartoon, sometimes focusing on conflicts between the Valorians. For instance, one storyline involves Questar being accused of murdering his jealous, scheming brother, Tark.

The first comic book issue, "The Path", was released in February 1989 and was 23 pages long. A Dino-Riders Annual was later released as a hardcover book that contained both the first and second issues in one collection.

Film adaptation
In October 2015, Tracking Board reported that Mattel has teamed with Solipsist Film to develop a live action Dino-Riders movie with Alissa Phillips and Stephen L’Heureux producing. As of 2018, there is no indication in the media that the film is going forward.

In other media
 In addition to the toys and comics, there were a number of other products released during the Dino-Riders run on television. These were primarily child-oriented products such as colouring books, puzzles, and crayons, but also included clothing, kites, stickers, and costumes. Tyco also released a number of Super Dough play sets.
 Some of the dinosaur shots in the French B movie Dinosaur from the Deep were made with a Dino-Riders walking T. Rex toy.
 Rex, the dinosaur toy (voiced by Wallace Shawn) from the Toy Story movies, is based on the Dino-Riders Tyrannosaurus toy. In the first film when the toys all met Buzz Lightyear and talking out where they came from, Rex says, "And I'm from Mattel, Well, I'm not actually from Mattel, I'm actually from a smaller company that was purchased in a leveraged buy-out", this is a reference to Mattel's acquisition of Tyco.
 In the South Park cartoon episode "Imaginationland Episode III", a Rulon Dino-Rider on a Tyrannosaurus can be seen for several seconds marching in the background with the other evil characters.
 In the Robot Chicken cartoon episode "G.I. Jogurt", the Dino-Riders have a rock song that is performed by Sebastian Bach. This theme song depicts the Dino-Riders treating the dinosaurs like weapons, running a labor camp to have the primitives make the Dino-Riders' stuff, and feeding babies to an armored Tyrannosaurus. Astra (voiced by Seth Green) quotes "hey, at least we don't have sex with the dinosaurs" while Bomba (also voiced by Seth Green) quotes "speak for yourself, bro."
 In the Teen Titans Go! episode "Open Door Policy" as part of the 5-day "Island Adventures" event, the Dino-Riders' battle-armored dinosaurs were parodied when Robin, Cyborg, Beast Boy, Starfire, and Raven find living dinosaurs like a Tyrannosaurus, Triceratops, Brontosaurus, Pterodactyl, and Velociraptor. They place battle armor on them to see which one is the strongest instead of planning a dinosaur theme park. This doesn't go well as the armored dinosaurs attacked the Teen Titans. In the final part of the "Island Adventures" titled "The Titans Show", the armored dinosaurs are among the Island extras that help the Teen Titans fight Control Freak and the villains he assembled to watch this 5-day event.

See also
 Planet of Dinosaurs
 Terra Nova

References

External links
 
 Dino-Riders at the Big Cartoon DataBase
 dinoriders.com  A Dino-Riders fan site
 "Dino-Riders" Series Recap
 Toy and video information
 Comic book credits
 Dino-Riders by Tyco at www.figure-archive.net

1988 American television series debuts
1988 American television series endings
Action figures
Animated television series about dinosaurs
1980s toys
1980s American animated television series
American children's animated action television series
American children's animated adventure television series
American children's animated science fantasy television series
Television series by Marvel Productions
Marvel Comics titles
First-run syndicated television programs in the United States
Marvel Action Universe
English-language television shows
Television series by Disney–ABC Domestic Television
Television series by Mattel Creations
Television series by Saban Entertainment
Television shows based on Mattel toys
American time travel television series
Television series about alien visitations
Television series created by Gerry Conway